Sulabh Samachar (Sulov Somachar) was a Bengali weekly, published from Kolkata, a pioneering journalistic venture in 19th century Bengal.

Indian Reform Association

Keshub Chunder Sen established the Indian Reform Association on returning from England in 1870. One of the things that impressed him was the immense power of the press, particularly the daily newspaper in England. The objective of the Cheap Literature section of the Association was to disseminate useful and scientific information amongst the masses by the publication of cheap and useful tracts.

Cheap Newspaper

Sulabh Samachar was started on 16 November 1870. It was priced one pice (the smallest unit of currency). Umanath Gupta was the first editor of this cheap journal for the information of the masses. At the time there were about a dozen similar pice newspapers in Kolkata.
 
Initially 1,000 copies were printed. The circulation increased to 5,000 in two weeks and in two months to 8,000. It was avidly read by common people who were for brought in touch with events that were happening around them.

The weekly dealt with diverse subjects such as the miserable condition of the peasants, the administrative system, measures for the uplift of the common people and their education,  abuses of the zamindari system and exploitation by the zamindars, abuses of the British administration, importance of science and scientific explanations in elementary form, diseases of the human body and their remedies, and prices of commodities, apart from general news from urban and rural areas.

Further reading

  History of the Brahmo Samaj  by Sivanath Sastri, Sadharan Brahmo Samaj, 211 Bidhan Sarani, Kolkata – 700 026.
  Keshub Chunder Sen: A Study in Encounter and Response  by Kashinath Kayal, Minerva Associates (Publications) Pvt. Ltd., 7B Lake Place, Kolkata 700 029.
  Keshub Chunder Sen  by P.K.Sen, Centenary Committee, Peace Cottage, 84 Upper Circular Road, Kolkata.

Publications established in 1870
Bengali-language newspapers published in India
Defunct newspapers published in India
1870 establishments in India